Ali Mohammad Ghorbani is a "prominent" Iranian reformist. He is the leader of the Reformist Front Coordination Council.

References

Iranian reformists
Year of birth missing (living people)
Living people
Place of birth missing (living people)